The Odesa City garden is located in town centre of Odesa, Ukraine, at the Derybasivska Street. Founded by Felix de Ribas (brother of José de Ribas) in 1803, it is the oldest park in the city. Felix de Ribas was an owner of most of this part of the town, but did not have enough resources to sustain the expenditure, and so he donated the territory of the city garden to the city on November 10, 1806.

The garden includes the summer theatre of the Odesa Orchestra, by architect R.A. Vladimirskaya (1949), the pavilion, by architect A.A. Gentsler (1943) and a number of sculptures and monuments.

The last reconstruction took place in 2007, when the pavilion, music fountain, and facades of buildings were renovated.

References

Sources 
 Пилявский В. А. Здания, сооружения, памятники Одессы и их зодчие. – 2-е изд. – Одесса: Optimum, 2010. – 276 с. –

Gallery 

Gardens in Ukraine
Derybasivska Street
Parks and gardens in Odesa